Lee Anthony Piché (born May 8, 1958) is an American prelate of the Roman Catholic Church. He served as an auxiliary bishop of the Archdiocese of St. Paul and Minneapolis in Minnesota from 2009 to 2015.

Biography

Early life and education
The eldest of seven children, Lee Piché was born on May 8, 1958, in Minneapolis, Minnesota, to LeRoy and Cecilia Piché. He attended Irondale High School in New Brighton, Minnesota and the University of St. Thomas in St. Paul. He studied at St. Paul Seminary in St. Paul, where he obtained a Master of Theology degree.

Ordination and ministry
Piché was ordained into the priesthood by Archbishop John Roach for the Archdiocese of St. Paul and Minneapolis on May 26, 1984. He then served as associate pastor at St. Mark's Parish in St. Paul, Minnesota, until 1987, when he joined the faculty of the University of St. Thomas in St. Paul. Piché then furthered his studies at St. Joseph Seminary in Princeton, New Jersey (1987-1988), and at Columbia University in New York City, earning a Master of Philosophy degree in 1994.

From 1994 to 1999, Piché taught undergraduate philosophy at the University of St. Thomas. He served as pastor of St. Joseph Parish in West St. Paul, Minnesota, (1999-2005), and of All Saints Parish in Lakeville, Minnesota (2005-2008). From 2000 to 2008, Piché served as chairman of the Archdiocesan Commission for Ecumenism and Interreligious Affairs. In June 2008, he was named pastor of St. Andrew Parish in St. Paul as well as vicar general and moderator of the curia for the archdiocese.

Auxiliary Bishop of St. Paul and Minneapolis
On May 27, 2009, Piché was appointed as an auxiliary bishop of the Archdiocese of St. Paul and Minneapolis and titular bishop of Tamata by Pope Benedict XVI. He received his episcopal consecration on June 29, 2009, from Archbishop John Nienstedt, with Archbishop Harry Flynn and Bishop John LeVoir serving as co-consecrators, at the Cathedral of St. Paul.

Retirement 
The Vatican announced on June 15, 2015, that Pope Francis had accepted Piché's resignation as auxiliary bishop, citing the provision of canon law that allows a bishop to resign when some "grave reason" makes it impossible to continue to fulfill his duties.

See also
 
 Catholic Church hierarchy
 Catholic Church in the United States
 Historical list of the Catholic bishops of the United States
 List of the Catholic bishops of the United States
 Lists of patriarchs, archbishops, and bishops

References

External links
Catholic-Hierarchy
Archdiocese of St. Paul and Minneapolis
United States Conference of Catholic Bishops

Episcopal succession

1958 births
Living people
21st-century American Roman Catholic titular bishops
Roman Catholic Archdiocese of Saint Paul and Minneapolis
American people of French-Canadian descent
Clergy from Minneapolis
University of St. Thomas (Minnesota) alumni
Saint Paul Seminary School of Divinity alumni
Saint Joseph's Seminary (New Jersey) alumni
University of St. Thomas (Minnesota) faculty
Columbia University alumni
Religious leaders from Minnesota